It Hatched is an Icelandic horror film from 2021, directed by Elvar Gunnarsson.

It Hatched stars Pétur and Mira, who dream of opening a guesthouse in a remote West Iceland fjord. However, their plans come to a halt when Mira lays an egg containing a baby, and an ancient ancient demon escapes from under the basement floor.

It also won the award for Best International Film at the MidWest WeirdFest.

References

External links 

 It Hatched at the Icelandic Film Centre
 
 

2021 films
Icelandic horror films